The Angatuba State Forest ( is a state forest in the state of São Paulo, Brazil.

Location

The Angatuba State Forest is in the municipality of Angatuba in the state of São Paulo.
The terrain is moderately hilly.
The climate is warm, with a dry winter.
Vegetation includes fragments of seasonal forest, with 80% of the area used for experimental plantings of exotic and native species.

History

The Angatuba State Forest was created by state governor decree 44.489 of 5 January 1965.
The forest contains the  Angatuba Ecological Station, a strictly protected area created in 1985.

Notes

Sources

1965 establishments in Brazil
State forests of Brazil
Protected areas of São Paulo (state)
Protected areas established in 1965